Gunnar "Gurken" Fosseng (born 7 August 1967) is a Norwegian handball goalkeeper. He made his debut on the Norwegian national team in 1987, and played 164 matches for the national team between 1987 and 2003.  At the 2001 World Men's Handball Championship he was captain for the Norwegian team.

On club level he played for Falk, Sandefjord, Stavanger, Nøtterøy, for Pilotes Posada Academia Octavio (Spain) (1999–2002) and for Trelleborg in Sweden.

References

1967 births
Living people
Norwegian male handball players
Expatriate handball players
Norwegian expatriate sportspeople in Spain